Roberto De Filippis (born 28 January 1988) is an Italian former professional footballer who played as a midfielder.

Career
Born in Milan, Lombardy, De Filippis started his career at Internazionale, which he played from Giovanissimi Regionali (under-15 team) in 2001–02 to Primavera under-20 team in 2006–07 season. He also named as a member of 2006–07 UEFA Champions League as home-grown player (B list) In January 2007 he left for Pro Sesto along with Marco Modolo, and Daniele Marino. He then played for the first team from 2008 to 2010.

In 2010 the club relegated back to Serie D and folded soon after. He then joined Serie D team Viterbese.

Honours
Pro Sesto youth
 Campionato Nazionale Dante Berretti: 2008

References

External links
 Football.it Profile 

1988 births
Living people
Italian footballers
Inter Milan players
S.S.D. Pro Sesto players
U.S. Viterbese 1908 players
Association football midfielders
Footballers from Milan